Ağçay (also, Agchay) is a village and municipality in the Qakh Rayon of Azerbaijan.  It has a population of 376.

References 

Populated places in Qakh District